Renu may refer to:

ReNu, a brand of soft contact lens care products
Renu (footballer), Indian footballer
Renu (boxer), Indian boxer
Renadive, cinematographer